Bidak-e Bala (also Romanized as Bīdak-e Bālā; also known as Bīdak-e Vasaţī) is a village in Eskelabad Rural District, Nukabad District, Khash County, Sistan and Baluchestan Province, Iran. At the 2006 census, its population was 68, in 19 families.

References 

Populated places in Khash County